Donald Michael Remy (born February 8, 1967) is an American attorney, former military officer, and athletic administrator who has served in the Biden administration as the 9th United States Deputy Secretary of Veterans Affairs since July 2021.

Education 
Remy earned a Bachelor of Arts degree in political science and business administration from Louisiana State University in 1988 and a Juris Doctor from the Howard University School of Law in 1991.

Career 
Remy served in the United States Army, resigning with the rank of captain. From 1991 to 1995, he served as assistant to the General Counsel of the Army. Remy was a law clerk for Judge Nathaniel R. Jones of the United States Court of Appeals for the Sixth Circuit and a senior associate attorney at O'Melveny & Myers. From 1997 to 2000, Remy served as a deputy assistant attorney general in the United States Department of Justice. From 2000 to 2006, Remy was the senior vice president, chief compliance officer, and general counsel for Fannie Mae. He was also a law partner at Latham & Watkins. In April 2009, Remy was nominated by President Barack Obama to be General Counsel of the Department of the Army.  He appeared before the Senate Committee on Armed Services, but the nomination was withdrawn in June 2009 after the committee declined to advance it to the full Senate.  In 2011, he joined the National Collegiate Athletic Association as chief operating officer and chief legal officer.

In April 2021, President Joe Biden nominated Remy to be the deputy secretary of the Department of Veterans Affairs; the Senate voted to confirm his nomination on July 15, 2021, in a 91–8 vote. He was sworn in as the 9th Deputy Secretary of Veterans Affairs by Secretary Denis McDonough on July 19, 2021. On March 1, 2023, the Department of Veterans Affairs announced his resignation, effective April 1.

References 

1967 births
Living people
People from Prince George County, Virginia
Louisiana State University alumni
United States Army officers
Howard University School of Law alumni
Clinton administration personnel
National Collegiate Athletic Association people
Biden administration personnel
United States Deputy Secretaries of Veterans Affairs